Carlos Alberto "Tito" Etcheverry D'Angelo (June 29, 1933 in Buenos Aires – August 28, 2014) was an Argentine former soccer player and coach, who is most known in Mexico for being the first top-scorer of the Pumas de la UNAM.

Biography 

Etcheverry was born in the Barrio de La Paternal, in Buenos Aires, Argentina. When was 17, he debuted as a professional, playing for Boca Juniors. After several seasons, he was transferred to Chacarita Juniors. In 1957, he was hired by the Mexican León, recommended by his brother-in-law and also a soccer player, Oscar Nova.

In 1964, Etcheverry became the first top-goalscorer of the Pumas de la UNAM, with 20 goals.

Besides León and UNAM, "Tito" Etcheverry also played in Mexico for Club Irapuato, Atlante F.C., and Jabatos de Nuevo León, where he served as player-manager. He later went on to become manager of CF Monterrey.

Etcheverry died due to complications related to his battle with diabetes, in Leon, on August 28, 2014.

References

External links
Campeones de Goleo en México

1933 births
2014 deaths
Footballers from Buenos Aires
Argentine footballers
Argentine people of Basque descent
Association football forwards
Boca Juniors footballers
Chacarita Juniors footballers
Irapuato F.C. footballers
Atlante F.C. footballers
Club León footballers
Argentine Primera División players
Liga MX players
Argentine expatriate footballers
Expatriate footballers in Mexico
Argentine emigrants to Mexico
Argentine football managers
C.F. Monterrey managers
Club Universidad Nacional footballers